The Lost Topic Tapes: Cowes Harbour 1957 is an album by American folk musician Ramblin' Jack Elliott, released in 2004. Elliott recorded a number of albums on the Topic label in London in the 1950s. The songs on this compilation are taken from rediscovered tapes found in the British Library in London. They were recorded on a yacht at Cowes Harbour in 1957. Several songs were issued in Britain on Jack Takes the Floor.

Reception

Writing for Allmusic, music critic Steve Leggett wrote the album "The sequence here is a fairly typical Elliott set of the time, made up of Guthrie tunes (including a fine version of "Tom Joad"), traditional American folk songs, and other pieces that fit his style... Things get a little affected when Elliott talks between songs, but when he sings, it all works, and his guitar playing is always simple, appropriate, and top-notch."

Track listing
All songs Traditional unless otherwise noted.
"Intro" – 0:48
"Hard Travelin'" (Woody Guthrie) – 3:57
"Big Rock Candy Mountain" – 1:43
"Old Rattler" (J. K. Hunter) – 2:18
"Talking Columbia Blues" (Guthrie) – 3:06
"Streets of Laredo" – 2:27
"Jack of Diamonds" – 3:23
"Rusty Jiggs & Sandy Sam" – 2:54
"Tom Joad" (Guthrie) – 7:25
"Acres of Clams" – 2:31
"Freight Train" (Elizabeth Cotten) – 1:13
"Chisholm Trail" – 1:57
"Crawdad Song" – 2:25
"Black Girl (aka In the Pines)" – 3:04
"Tom Dooley" – 2:16
"Rocky Mountain Belle" – 1:30

Personnel
Ramblin' Jack Elliott – vocals, guitar
Production notes:
Bruce Bromberg – project supervisor
Larry Sloven – project supervisor
Bob Stone – editing, remastering
Richard Swettenham – engineer
Bill Leader – assistant engineer
Dick Reeves – graphic design
Robert Wylie – liner notes

References

External links
Ramblin' Jack Elliott Illustrated discography

Ramblin' Jack Elliott compilation albums
2004 compilation albums